John Jay Martin (August 9, 1916 – March 17, 1968) was a professional football player who played in the league from 1941–1945. Martin played for the Chicago Cardinals, Boston Yanks and "Card-Pitt", a team that was the result of a temporary merger between the Chicago Cardinals and the Pittsburgh Steelers. The teams' merger was a result of the manning shortages experienced league-wide due to World War II. He was released from "Card-Pitt" after the team's game against the Green Bay Packers, when it was discovered that John McCarthy could average 35 yards per punt. He then signed with the Boston Yanks.

References

1916 births
Players of American football from Arkansas
Chicago Cardinals players
Boston Yanks players
Card-Pitt players
Oklahoma Sooners football players
1968 deaths
People from Nashville, Arkansas